Daniel Sáez Tomás (born 10 June 1985) is a Spanish motorcycle racer.

Career statistics

Grand Prix motorcycle racing

By season

Races by year

References

External links
 Profile on MotoGP.com

1985 births
Living people
Spanish motorcycle racers
125cc World Championship riders